Senecio pattersonensis is an uncommon species of flowering plant in the aster family known by the common names Mono ragwort. and Mount Patterson senecio.

Distribution
It grows in rocky high mountain habitat in an alpine climate, such as talus and fellfields.

It is named for Mount Patterson, the highest peak in the rugged Sweetwater Mountains subrange of the Sierra Nevada, in Mono County.

Description
Senecio pattersonensis is a small perennial herb producing one to three stems from a rhizome, the plant generally not exceeding ten centimeters in height.

The herbage is hairless and green to red in color. The leaves are thick and often fleshy, measuring 2 to 4 centimeters long. They are narrow and linear or lance-shaped, sometimes with wavy edges or divisions into lobes.

The inflorescence bears one to four flower heads containing yellow disc florets and usually 8 ray florets measuring one half to one centimeter in length. It blooms from July to August.

References

External links
CalFlora Database:   Senecio pattersonensis (Mono ragwort,  Patterson's senecio)
Jepson Manual eFlora (TJM2) treatment of Senecio pattersonensis
USDA Plants Profile: Senecio pattersonensis (Mono ragwort)
UC CalPhotos gallery of Senecio pattersonensis (Mono ragwort)

pattersonensis
Endemic flora of California
Alpine flora
Flora of the Sierra Nevada (United States)
Natural history of Mono County, California